Ólafsson is a surname of Icelandic origin, that means son of Ólafur. In Icelandic names, the name is not strictly a surname, but a patronymic. The name refers to:
Bragi Ólafsson (born 1962), Icelandic musician and writer
Eggert Ólafsson (1726–1768), Iceland explorer and writer; conservator of the Icelandic language
Friðrik Ólafsson (born 1935), Icelandic chess grandmaster
Gunnsteinn Ólafsson (born 1962), Icelandic orchestra and opera conductor
Hössi Ólafsson (born 1977), Icelandic rapper and actor
Jón Ólafsson (1850–1916), Icelandic journalist and poet
Kjartan Ólafsson (disambiguation), various people
Logi Ólafsson (born 1954), Icelandic professional football coach
Magnús Óláfsson (disambiguation), various people
Ólafur Jóhann Ólafsson (born 1962), Icelandic writer and businessman; executive vice president of Time Warner
Víkingur Ólafsson (born 1984), Icelandic pianist.

Icelandic-language surnames
Patronymic surnames